Flood is a traditional Irish and Scottish surname and may refer to:
 Alexandra Flood (born 1990), Australian operatic soprano, sister of Georgia Flood
 Ann Flood (born 1930), American actress
 Anthony Flood (born 1984), Irish footballer
 Chris Flood (born 1947), Irish politician
 Colleen M. Flood, professor 
 Curt Flood (1938–1997), American baseball player
 Daniel J. Flood (1903–1994), American politician
 Dennis Flood, American politician, mayor of Irvington, New York in 1994–2006
 Edward Flood (1805–1888), Australian politician
 Emmet Flood, American attorney
 Frank Flood (1901–1921), Irish war of independence soldier
 Georgia Flood, Australian actress, sister of Alexandra Flood
 Gerald Flood (1927–1989), British actor
 Henry Flood (1732–1791), Irish politician
 Hulda Flood (1886–1968), Swedish politician
 James Clair Flood, (1826–1889), American businessman
 Liam Flood (circa 1943 – 2014), Irish bookmaker and poker player
 Lisa Flood (born 1971), Canadian swimmer
 Mark Flood (disambiguation), several people
 Martin Flood (born 1964), Australian quiz–show winner
 Michael Flood (21st century), Australian sociologist
 Mike Flood (born 1975), American politician
 Philip Flood (born 1935), Australian diplomat
 Robert L. Flood (born 1955), British management scientist
 Sonny Flood (born 1989), British actor
 Toby Flood (born 1985), English rugby union player
 W. H. Grattan Flood (1857–1928), Irish musicologist, historian, and author
 Warden Flood (1694–1764), Irish judge and politician, MP for Callan 1727–1760, Lord Chief Justice 1760–1764
 Warden Flood (1735–1797), Irish politician, MP 1769–1797 for Longford Borough, Carysfort, Baltinglass, then Taghmon; nephew of the judge
 Willo Flood (born 1985), Irish footballer
 Sarah Flood-Beaubrun (born 1969), Saint Lucian lawyer and politician

See also
 Mark Ellis (born 1960), British record producer known professionally as "Flood"

English-language surnames
Surnames of Irish origin